Bherwerre Beach (sometimes known as Five Mile Beach) is a long beach located in Booderee National Park, Jervis Bay Territory, Australia.

History 

On the night of 10 December 1835, the convict transportation ship Hive, carrying convicts from Dublin, Ireland, ran aground on the beach and was subsequently shipwrecked after being removed from the beach. It was subsequently added to the NSW State Heritage Register in April 2010.

Fauna 
The beach and the surrounding dunes are a known habitat for many species of birds, including the pied oystercatcher, the hooded plover, the wandering albatross, the white-headed petrel, the providence petrel, the Salvin's prion, the Antarctic prion, the wedge-tailed shearwater, the brown booby, the white-necked heron, the whistling kite, the brown falcon, the red-capped plover, the ruddy turnstone, the bar-tailed godwit, the curlew sandpiper, the caspian tern, the white-throated needletail, the golden-headed cisticola, the chestnut-rumped heathwren, the buff-rumped thornbill and the white-fronted chat.

Flora

Gallery

See also 

 Sussex Inlet, New South Wales
 Booderee National Park and Botanic Gardens
 Jervis Bay Territory

References

External links 

 Booderee National Park beaches
 VisitNSW overview of Bherwerre Beach

Beaches of Jervis Bay Territory